Mohamed Abdulla (6 December 1974) is a Maldivian film producer, actor and a politician.

Career

Acting career
In his career, Abdulla starred in a limited feature films; Bulbulaa (1999) and Amjad Ibrahim's comedy drama film Majubooru Loabi (2000). The latter being a commercial success, marks the only collaboration of Abdulla with legendary comedy actors, Haajara Abdul Kareem and Sithi Fulhu.

Abdulla made his career breakthrough with the role Muhamma in the first installment of Dheke Dhekeves (2004) short film series which extended until the sixth installment, released in 2012. The success of the character Muhamma retained with several other projects including the short film series, Falhi Sikunthu and the television series, Mohamma Gaadiyaa. Other successful short film series of Abdulla includes the short film series, Haa Shaviyani Rasgefaanu and Farihibe. Apart from starring in these films, Abdulla served as the producer from his production company, Dhekedheke Ves Productions.

In 2008, he released the period short film Faqeeru Koe starring opposite Sheela Najeeb which was considered as one of the "best critically acclaimed short film" made in local cinema. At the 1st Maldives Film Awards ceremony, he was bestowed with the Best Actor award in the short films category. He received the second award from the same category in the 3rd Maldives Film Awards ceremony, for the titular role in the fourth installment of the Farihibe series.

From 2011, the theme of his comedy films expanded into political drama genre where short films Siyaasee Vaccine (2011), 13 Ah Visnaa Dhehaas (2012) and Siyaasee Koalhun (2012), all starring opposite Ismail Rasheed were released to positive response from critics and audience. The latter two fetched him further two nominations in the Best Actor - Short film category.

Political career
Abdulla contested in the 2014 Maldivian parliamentary election and was elected as the Member of Parliament for Ihavandhoo constituency on a Jumhooree Party ticket as part of the former ruling coalition. However, citing a pledge to work with the government to deliver infrastructure projects, he signed for the Progressive Party of Maldives shortly after the elections. In July 2017, Abdulla left the party after backing the opposition's bid to impeach the former speaker. Shortly after, the Supreme Court announced that he has lost his seat over an anti-defection ruling. After more than a year out of parliament, in October 2018, he was reinstated as the Member of Parliament. In November 2018, he signed for the Maldivian Democratic Party but fails to contest to back his seat as the parliament member for Ihavandhoo constituency through the party's primary and individually.

Media image
In 2011, Abdulla was voted as the "Most Entertaining Actor" in the SunFM Awards 2010, an award night ceremony initiated by Sun Media Group to honour the most recognized personalities in different fields, during the previous year, while defending the award in the next year.

Filmography

Feature film

Short film

Television

Other work

Accolades

References 

1974 births
Living people
People from Malé
21st-century Maldivian actors
Maldivian film actors
Members of the People's Majlis